Sir Valentine Browne, 5th Baronet and 3rd Viscount Kenmare in the Jacobite Peerage (1695–1736)

Birth and origins 
Valentine was the son of Nicholas Browne and his wife, Helen Browne. His father was the 2nd Viscount Kenmare. His mother was his father's cousin, being the eldest daughter of Thomas Browne of Hospital, County Limerick.

{{Tree chart| | | | | |VlnB7|y|ChtDl|boxstyle=border-width: 1px; border-radius: 0.5em;
 |VlnB7=Valentine1st Earl|boxstyle_VlnB7=border-width: 1px; border-radius: 0.5em; background: lavender;
 |ChtDl='CharlotteDillon}}

 Early life 
After the death of his father in 1720, he succeeded to the family estates which had been under the management of John Asgill because his grandfather Sir Valentine Browne was a supporter of the Jacobite cause who took part in the Battle of Aughrim. For this he was attainted and the family estates forfeited.

The inheritance to which he succeeded was deep in debt due to mismanagement by Asgill. The difficulty experienced in meeting the heavy encumbrances on the impoverished estate fostered disputes in the family and drove close relatives into law with each other, much of which was both protracted and costly.

The exact status of Browne as either a Baronet or Viscount is disputable. He was unambiguously a baronet. The Viscountcy of Kenmare was created by James II in the Peerage of Ireland after his deposition as King of England, but before his deposition from the Irish throne. The peerage may be regarded as legitimate beyond Jacobites, but the Protestant establishment of the day did not recognise it.

 First marriage and children 
Valentine Browne married, firstly, Honora Butler, daughter of Colonel Thomas Butler and his wife Margaret Bourke, in November 1720. Egan O'Rahilly wrote an Irish poem, called the epithalamium'', for the wedding.

Valentine and Honora had a son:
Thomas

Honora Butler died of smallpox in 1730.

Second marriage and children 
He married, secondly, Mary FitzGerald, daughter of Sir Maurice FitzGerald, in October 1735.

Valentine and Mary had a daughter.

Late life and death 
It is possible that his financial difficulties caused him to refuse the requests of the poet Egan O'Rahilly to restore his land to him. This refusal caused O'Rahilly to compose a bitter and mournful poem called "Valentin Brown" in which he launches a vitriolic attack on the viscount. 

In later years, however, the estate gained a sound financial position after portions of it were sold. Sir Valentine died on 30 June 1736, aged 41.

Poem 
Egan O'Rahilly's poem "Valentin Brown", translated by Frank O'Connor, reads:

That my old bitter heart was pierced in this black doom,
That foreign devils have made our land a tomb,
That the sun that was Munster's glory has gone down
Has made me a beggar before you, Valentine Brown

That royal Cashel is bare of house and guest,
That Brian's turreted home is the otter's nest,
That the kings of the land have neither land nor crown
Has made me a beggar before you, Valentine Brown.

Garnish away in the west with its master banned,
Hamburg the refuge of him who has lost his land,
An old grey eye, weeping for lost renown,
Have made me a beggar before you, Valentine Brown.

Notes and references

Notes

Citations

Sources 

  – A to Bo
  – 1611 to 1625
 
  – Barons

External links 
 Public Record office of Northern Ireland, Kenmare papers

1695 births
1736 deaths
Baronets in the Baronetage of Ireland
Valentine
People from County Kerry
Viscounts in the Jacobite peerage